The 2013 Nobel Prize in Literature was awarded to the Canadian writer Alice Munro (born 1931) as "master of the contemporary short story." She is the first Canadian and the 13th woman to receive the prize.

Laureate

Alice Munro has dedicated her literary career almost exclusively to the short story genre. She grew up in a small Canadian town – Huron County, Ontario – the kind of environment that often provides the backdrops for her stories. These often accommodate the entire epic complexity of the novel in just a few short pages and the underlying themes of her work are often relationship problems and moral conflicts. The relationship between memory and reality is another recurring theme she uses to create tension. With subtle means, she is able to demonstrate the impact that seemingly trivial events can have on a person's life. Her famous short story collections include Dance of the Happy Shades (1969), Who Do You Think You Are? (1978), The Progress of Love (1986), The Love of a Good Woman (1998), and Runaway (2004).

Award ceremony
Due to her health condition and old age, Alice Munro was not able to personally participate in the award ceremony in Stockholm. Mrs. Jenny Munro, her daughter, received the diploma, medal and monetary prize from King Carl XVI Gustaf on her behalf on December 10, 2013.

Peter Englund, permanent secretary of the Swedish Academy, expressed the rightfulness of bestowing Munro the Nobel prize, by saying:

References

External links
Prize announcement 2013 nobelprize.org
Award Ceremony nobelprize.org
Award ceremony speech nobelprize.org

2013